Woodbine Township is one of twenty-three townships in Jo Daviess County, Illinois, USA.  As of the 2010 census, its population was 584 and it contained 399 housing units.  Its name changed from Jefferson Township on September 13, 1853.

Geography

Cities, towns, villages
 Community of Woodbine.

Cemeteries
The township contains Woodbine Cemetery.

Major highways
  U.S. Route 20 east towards Stockton and west towared Elizabeth.

Demographics

School districts
 River Ridge Community Unit School District 210.
 Stockton Community Unit School District 206.

Political districts
 Illinois' 16th congressional district.
 State House District 89.
 State Senate District 45.

References
 
 United States Census Bureau 2007 TIGER/Line Shapefiles.
 United States National Atlas.

External links
 Jo Daviess County official site.
 City-Data.com.
 Illinois State Archives.
 Township Officials of Illinois.

Townships in Jo Daviess County, Illinois
Townships in Illinois